The 8K is a French-built electric locomotive used in China. It is developed and built by Alstom. The design of 8K is based on SNCF Class BB 15000 electric locomotives. It is a kind of locomotives with Bo′Bo′+Bo′Bo′ wheel arrangement used in China.

8K Electric Locomotive is an eight shaft fixing reconnection heavy freight electric locomotive which based on two four-axle locomotives connected.

Preservation
 8K-001: is preserved at Fengtai Locomotive Depot, Beijing Railway Bureau
 8K-008: is preserved at China Railway Museum
 8K-065: is preserved at Tianjin Railway Vacational Technical College
 8K-091: is preserved at Taiyuan Locomotive Depot, Taiyuan Railway Bureau

See also
 List of locomotives in China
 China Railways 6Y2
 China Railways 8G
 China Railways SS4
 China Railways HXD2

References

External links
 China Railways 8K profile on Trainspo
 China Railways 8K profile on TrainNets
 European Railway Picture Gallery

Bo′Bo′+Bo′Bo′ locomotives
8G
25 kV AC locomotives
Railway locomotives introduced in 1987
Standard gauge locomotives of China